Steven Bryant (born October 10, 1959) is a former professional American football player who played wide receiver for five seasons for the Houston Oilers and Indianapolis Colts. In 1985, Bryant appeared as a contestant on the game show Press Your Luck, where he won $16,655 in cash and prizes.

References

1959 births
Living people
American football wide receivers
Contestants on American game shows
Houston Oilers players
Indianapolis Colts players
National Football League replacement players
Purdue Boilermakers football players
Players of American football from Los Angeles